is a 1989 video game developed by Micronet for the Mega Drive video game console. It is a horizontally scrolling shooter with five levels. Although an American release was planned, it was never officially released outside Japan.

Plot
The story takes place in an alien solar system and focuses on the history of its two inhabited planets: Parceria and Seneca. For many years, the people of these planets lived in harmony together with the seemingly more advanced Parcerians continually visiting the Senecans. However, something happened on Parceria: something caused the Parcerians to shut off all forms of communication, visitation and activity with Seneca. Over time, Parceria's environment died out, leaving only a planet-wide barren terrain. Hundreds of years have now passed and the current generation of Senecans see Parceria as nothing but a dead husk with the concept of life and companionship on it being mere, long forgotten legends.

One day, an enormous attack force flies from Parceria and attacks Seneca without warning. Confirmed to be the Parcerian Military, the invaders cripple Seneca's defense forces. Besides being well armed and equipped, the Parceria Military is also able to manipulate the wildlife to do its bidding through unknown means, ensuring no possible escape to safety. The desperate people of Seneca eventually discovered an ancient star fighter abandoned by the Parcerians called The Baldanders. Using its super-technology, the people of Seneca use the Baldanders in a counter-attack against the Parcerian invasion to destroy their main battleship: a large, mysterious warship known only as 'Mother.'

Gameplay
Curse is similar to many other sideways/horizontal scrolling shooters, most notably R-Type. Various power-ups can be collected to boost weapons and speed. The object of the game is to shoot all other enemies that appear on screen and avoid crashing into bullets, enemies or foreground scenery. There are end-of-level boss enemies that stay with the player until they are defeated. There are no difficulty settings but the extends (aka: 1ups) are awarded every 1 million points.

The Baldanders star fighter has an advantage over most scrolling shooter ships at the time in that it is equipped with a shield. When players are hit by bullets or missiles, the shield takes a hit for the ship. The shield can take three hits total before the player's ship is destroyed. Players are equipped with a standard laser shot that can be upgraded when certain power-ups are collected. The player has access to three different upgradable weapons: the V-Laser which fires in three directions, the Wide Beam which can shoot through every foreground object (except for the flying orange iron rock objects) and the Crash Shot a slow firing cluster of gray, explosive crystals that scatter shrapnel in the opposite direction of its impact. Other items includes Homing Missiles which scan over terrain, shield Energy pick-ups, Speed-Ups and Options.

The Options increase the number of the player's standard laser shots and allows the player to fire standard shots upwards, backwards and downwards depending on each Option's direction. Two could be collected at one time. The player can rotate them to two fixed directions: horizontal and vertical using the C button. The player can also use each sphere as a shield against most enemy fire. The Baldanders is equipped with the iconic Shmup Smart Bomb weapon which destroys all enemies and/or enemy shots on the screen using the A button. The Bomb however does not have its own pick-up icon: in order to supply the ship with more bombs, the player has to upgrade either one of the three items available to them completely by picking up the same icon three times in a row. Once the weapon is upgraded, the next icon of the same weapon the player uses adds to the bomb supply.

Reception

The game utilized full parallax scrolling through most of the game, however, the graphics were not considered as anything special by the reviewers of the time. The game's audio received better reviews and a sound test was available by holding down buttons A and Start on the title screen (various other options were available here for adjusting the game difficulty and other standard features). Console XS gave a review score of 28% and opining the game is the worst shoot ‘em up ever on the Sega Genesis. MegaTech initially praised the game being fun to play although criticizes Curse that it suffers from a lack of originality and when the player loses they lose the extra weapons and very difficult to continue since the game only has five levels. Mega Play's four reviewers gave positive reviews giving both positive and negative reviews on the game's challenging gameplay and one reviewer felt the gameplay was unfair because of the amount of enemies attacking at once although praised Curse that it stood out as a great shooter for the Genesis. The reviewers also criticized the shooting animation and the lack of levels.

References

External links
 Micronet

1989 video games
Horizontally scrolling shooters
Sega Genesis games
Sega Genesis-only games
Japan-exclusive video games
Video games developed in Japan
Single-player video games
Video games set on fictional planets
Science fiction video games
Micronet co., Ltd. games